Ida Kramer Vium (born 2 February 1996) is a former Danish handball player who last played for Skövde HF in Sweden, until the summer of 2020.

References

1996 births
Living people
Danish female handball players
People from Lemvig
Sportspeople from the Central Denmark Region